The men's sprint cross-country skiing competition at the 2006 Winter Olympics in Turin, Italy, was held on 22 February at Pragelato.

Vasily Rochev was the defending world champion at this event, but he won in the classical style. The last free style sprint at the World Championships was won by Thobias Fredriksson in 2003, while Tor Arne Hetland was defending Olympic champion. Swede Björn Lind won the two most recent World Cup events, and also won the Olympic race, beating Frenchman Roddy Darragon to the line. Darragon won France's first cross-country skiing medal in the history of the Olympics, while Sweden took the bronze through Thobias Fredriksson.

Results

Qualifying
Eighty skiers completed the 1.3 kilometre course in the qualifying portion of the event, with the top thirty advancing to the quarterfinals.

Quarterfinals

There were five quarterfinal races, each with six skiers. The top two in each heat advanced to the semifinals.

Quarterfinal 1

Quarterfinal 2

Quarterfinal 3

Quarterfinal 4

Quarterfinal 5

Semifinals

There were two semifinal races, each with five skiers. The top two in each semifinal advanced to the A Final, to compete for the top four places, while the third and fourth placed finishers advanced to the B Final, for places five through eight.

Semifinal 1

Semifinal 2

Finals

Björn Lind finished 0.6 seconds ahead of Roddy Darragon to win the Olympic gold medal in the cross-country sprint.

Final A

Final B

References

Men's cross-country skiing at the 2006 Winter Olympics
Men's individual sprint cross-country skiing at the Winter Olympics